Brahim Merad (born 22 August 1953) is the Algerian Minister of Interior and Local Government. He was appointed as minister on 9 September 2022.

Education 
Merad graduated at the École nationale d'administration.

References 

Living people
21st-century Algerian politicians
Algerian politicians
Government ministers of Algeria

1953 births
École nationale d'administration alumni